The 1986 Kashmir Riots, also commonly referred to as the 1986 Anantnag Riots, were a series of attacks targeting Kashmiri Hindus in the Kashmir region of the then Indian state of Jammu and Kashmir, particularly in Anantnag district.

Background 
The JK Land Estates Abolition Act of 1950 allowed the govt to unilaterally confiscate private land owned by landlords, which adversely affected thousands of Kashmiri Hindus overnight. This also led to some Kashmiri Hindus leaving the state.

In 1982, Sheikh Abdullah died, with his son Farooq Abdullah taking over soon after. Despite winning the 1983 election, Farooq was replaced by Ghulam Mohammad Shah, also known as Gul Shah. In Anantnag Mufti Mohammad Sayeed, who later founded the PDP, was the elected representative at the time.

In early 1986, Gul Shah announced the construction of a masjid inside the location of an ancient Hindu Temple in the Jammu Civil Secretariat. This move sparked widespread criticism and protests in Jammu. In February, Gul Shah then went to Kashmir and provocatively said, "Islam khatre mein hain" (Translation: "Islam is in danger"). These incendiary statements by Gul Shah are believed to have been partially to blame for the breaking out of riots.

Rioting 
After the Indian government allowed the Babri Masjid (the location of the present Ram Mandir, believed to be the birthplace of Bhagwan Rama) to be opened for Hindu Worship, protests erupted. 8 cities in Jammu and Kashmir had curfews in place.  Hindu Temples were burned down and destroyed in towns including Vanpoh, Anantnag, Sopore, Luk Bawan, Salar (Pahalgam Tehsil), Fatehpur, Akura etc.

Anantnag, which saw much of the violence, had multiple attacks on Hindu Temples. Many Kashmiri Hindu owned shops, homes and properties were attacked and targeted. These developments led to a large number of Kashmiri Hindus shifting to places including Udhampur and Jammu. Thus the "first wave of exodus" of Kashmiri Hindus was in Anantnag district.

See also 
 Persecution of Hindus
 Anti-Hindu sentiment
 Exodus of Kashmiri Hindus
 Panun Kashmir
 Human rights abuses in Jammu and Kashmir
 Insurgency in Jammu and Kashmir
 Timeline of the Kashmir conflict
 Kashmir conflict
 Revocation of the special status of Jammu and Kashmir

References 

Anti-Hindu violence
Anti-Hindu sentiment
History of Hinduism
Persecution of Hindus
Persecution by Muslims
Kashmiri Hindus
Hinduism-related controversies
Human rights abuses in Jammu and Kashmir
Internal migration
Kashmir conflict
1980s in Jammu and Kashmir
Kashmiri nationalism